Jan Wadas (born 16 May 1944) is a Polish boxer. He competed in the men's featherweight event at the 1968 Summer Olympics. At the 1968 Summer Olympics, he lost to Ivan Mihailov of Bulgaria. At the 1968 Summer Olympics, he lost to Ivan Mihailov of Bulgaria.

References

1944 births
Living people
Polish male boxers
Olympic boxers of Poland
Boxers at the 1968 Summer Olympics
People from Tarnów County
Featherweight boxers
20th-century Polish people
21st-century Polish people